Héctor Raimundo Adomaitis Larrabure (born June 12, 1970) is a former Argentine footballer who played for clubs in Argentina, Uruguay, Mexico and Chile.

Career
Adomaitis began playing football with local side Club Atlético Temperley, before moving to Mexico where he would score 55 goals in 291 league matches.

Honors

Titles as player
Montevideo Wanderers
 Torneo Competencia: 1990

Colo-Colo
 Primera División de Chile: 1991
 Recopa Sudamericana: 1992
 Copa Interamericana: 1992

Santos Laguna
 Primera División de México: Invierno 1996

Cruz Azul
 Primera División de México: 1997
 CONCACAF Champions Cup: 1996, 1997

Titles as coach
Colo-Colo
 Primera División de Chile: Clausura 2008

Santos Laguna
 Primera División de México: Clausura 2012

References

External links
 
 
 futbolanonimato.blogspot.com
 

1970 births
Living people
Argentine expatriate footballers
Argentine footballers
Uruguayan Primera División players
Chilean Primera División players
Liga MX players
Club Atlético Temperley footballers
Montevideo Wanderers F.C. players
Deportes Concepción (Chile) footballers
Colo-Colo footballers
Santos Laguna footballers
Cruz Azul footballers
Club Puebla players
Santiago Morning footballers
Expatriate footballers in Chile
Expatriate footballers in Mexico
Expatriate footballers in Uruguay
Argentine people of Lithuanian descent
Association football midfielders
Sportspeople from Buenos Aires Province